Antonio Bresciani de Borsa (24 July 1798 – 14 March 1862) was an Italian Jesuit priest, novelist and journalist, mostly known for his reactionary diatribes against liberalism and the Risorgimento.

Biography 
Antonio Bresciani was born in 1798 in Ala near Trento from a noble family. In 1814, he moved to Verona and attended the St. Sebastian College. Following the completion of his studies there, in 1818 he joined the Seminary of Verona, where he studied theology. In 1821 he was ordained in Brixen. Once ordained, he travelled to Rome with the intention of entering the Society of Jesus. He was admitted to the Jesuit novitiate of St. Andrew. In 1828, he made his religious vows as a Jesuit in the house of novitiate in Chieri. Then he was sent to Genoa to the Jerome’s Academy. Between 1834 and 1848 as rector, he moved from one college to another around Italy: in 1834 at the Carmine College in Turin, in 1837 at the College of St. Bartholomew in Modena and in 1846 at the Pontificio Collegio Urbano de Propaganda Fide. 

On 9 January 1850, he was invited to Naples to take part in the first meeting of the editorial board of the review La Civiltà Cattolica. His task was to write novels. When he joined the founders of La Civiltà Cattolica Bresciani already had a large literary production and was a member of the prestigious Academy of Arcadia, under the pseudonym Tionide Nemesiano. 

During his tenure as literary editor at La Civiltà Cattolica, Bresciani launched his serialised trilogy of anti-Masonic novels: The Jew of Verona (1851), The Roman Republic and Lionello (1855). All of them became bestsellers. They dramatised how Freemasonry and related sects were working in secret to bring about anarchy, Christianity's destruction and Satan's triumph.

The typical elements of the feuilleton-novel, such as police intrigue, murder, rape, love, and betrayal were all central themes in Bresciani's novels. The Risorgimento was portrayed as the result of a “satanistically inspired conspiracy by secret societies”. Liberals and nationalists would bring “moral corruption, political disorder and devil worship”. The secularism and liberalism of the French Revolution and the Risorgimento were connected to Protestantism and pinned to the heinous motives of a foreign occupation and invasion.

Antonio Bresciani published extensively on socio-economic issues in La Civiltà Cattolica. He died in Rome in 1862. His complete works in seventeen volumes have been edited in 1869 by Civiltà Cattolica.

Works 
Antonio Bresciani  was a prolific writer and a novelist. His novels were published in serial form in the feuilleton section of La Civiltà Cattolica — at that time the paper with the widest circulation in Italy, with more than 60,000 subscribers. 

Bresciani had understood that to keep Italian youth close to the Catholic church it was not enough to provide lives of the saints, catechisms and moral literature, but full scale 'lay' novels whose religious content was far more subtly inserted.

The dominant tone of Bresciani's fiction was polemical. The villains represented the forces of Jacobinism, the secret societies of the early Risorgimento, and Freemasonry. Conspiracy was a constant theme. Indeed, the leitmotifs of anti-Jesuit polemic depicting the Society of Jesus as an occult conspiratorial organization were in turn deployed by the Jesuit writer against Freemasonry.

His novel L'Ebreo di Verona, published in the first six volumes of Civiltà Cattolica from 1850 to 1851, was enormously popular and was quickly translated into most European languages, including English, French, German, and Portuguese. The novel went through at least seventeen editions from ten publishers in five cities. Bresciani's title is an ironic reference to the anti-Jesuit novel by Eugène Sue, The Wandering Jew, a favorite among Italian liberals. L'Ebreo di Verona treated the influence of secret societies during the Italian Revolution of 1848, revealing the presence of dark Masonic forces working behind the scenes to foment the nationalist movements that would erupt into mass revolt.

In 1850 Bresciani published an ethnographic book in two volumes, Dei costumi dell'isola di Sardegna, comparing the Sardinian life and customs with the “oldest oriental peoples.” Bresciani's comparison relied mainly on the Bible, Homer, Herodotus and other ancient historians, but also on the works of modern scholars, such as Bochart and Vico.

Literary style 
Bresciani was a polished literary prose writer. A follower of Antonio Cesari, the most renowned among Italian purists, Bresciani was a staunch opponent of Romanticism. In a treatise on Romanticism (1839), he asserted: “Romanticism is not natural in itself ... is not natural to Italian taste ... [and] is harmful to the Christian religion, to good political regimen and to morality”. Despite his anti-Romantic stance, however, Bresciani’s fiction betrayed many influences from the Romantic culture of the Risorgimento that he claimed to despise.

Criticisms

Reactionarism 
The Marxist intellectual Antonio Gramsci used the terms “Brescianism” and “Father Bresciani's progeny” to describe literature of a conservative and populist bent. Gramsci compares the antisocialist reaction in Italy after the Red Biennium of 1919 to 1920 to the reactionary attitudes that Bresciani advocated after the revolution of 1848. In particular, Gramsci condemns Bresciani for fighting against the democratization and unification of Italy. To this end, in his essay entitled “Reaction and Revolution,” Gramsci cites the nineteenth-century literary critic Francesco De Sanctis, who, in a harshly critical review of Bresciani's novels, wrote that Bresciani expropriated revolutionary language for the cause of reaction, presenting Catholicism as the “true liberty” and calling the liberals “libertines”.

Antisemitism 
Bresciani's theories are characteristic of the “paranoid style” in politics, positing a Satanic conspiracy among secret societies and Jews to undermine the Christian order. According to some scholars, Bresciani's highly popular novel L'Ebreo di Verona shaped religious anti-Semitism for decades in Italy, as did his work for La Civiltà Cattolica, which he helped launch.

In fiction
Antonio Bresciani served as an inspiration for the creation of Father Bergamaschi, one of the main characters of Umberto Eco's novel The Prague Cemetery.

Selected works
 
 L'Ebreo di Verona, 4 vols., Bologna: Presso Marsigli e Rocchi, 1850–51.
 Della Repubblica Romana. Appendice a L'Ebreo di Verona, 2 vols., Milan, 1855.
 
 
 
 
 
 Lionello o delle Società Segrete (sequel to La Repubblica Romana).
 L'assedio di Ancona (unfinished)

References

Further reading

External links
 

Italian male writers
Roman Catholic writers
19th-century Italian novelists
19th-century Italian journalists
Italian Jesuits
Burials in Italy
Critics of atheism
Conservatism in Italy
Reactionary
Italian counter-revolutionaries
Antisemitism in Italy
Late modern Christian antisemitism
Roman Catholic conspiracy theorists
Critics of Freemasonry
1798 births
1862 deaths
Italian conspiracy theorists
Rectors of the Pontificio Collegio Urbano de Propaganda Fide
People from Ala, Trentino